The Stits SA-8A Skeeto is an early homebuilt ultralight design by Ray Stits. ("Ultralight" was not official classification in America at the time since Code of Federal Regulations Title 14 (Federal Aviation Regulations) Part 103, better known as 14 CFR Part 103 or just Part 103, which defined ultralight vehicles in the United States, was not adopted until 1982.)

Development
The Skeeto was initially intended to be an affordable light aircraft that could be built complete for under $500 in 1957. The fuselage was welded steel tubing, with mostly fabric covered wood construction for the wings and control surfaces. The engine for this kit venture was to be a low cost off-the shelf model.  
Test model 2 was a two cycle  engine with a belt reduction. 
Test model 3 used two engines on a single v-belt making it a  twin engine which flew at 25 mph. 
Test model 4 had a homelite chainsaw engine at 
Test model 5 used a Disston chain saw engine at 
Test model 6 used a Disston chain saw engine mounted inverted.
Test model 7 used an Inverted Evinrude  outboard boat motor.
Test model 8 used a right-side up Evinrude.

Operational history
Test flights were limited to the length of the runway after the aircraft was registered as a "research and development" project.  The roll rate was so low at 20-30 mph, that rudder turns were preferred. The 3-4 pound wing loading was considered impractically light for handling. An example of a SA-8 Skeeto was donated to the Claremont, California Air Museum in 1958, it is now in the EAA AirVenture Museum in Oshkosh, Wisconsin.

Specifications (Stits SA-8A Skeeto)

References

Homebuilt aircraft
1950s United States sport aircraft
Parasol-wing aircraft
Single-engined tractor aircraft